Family Entertainment is the second album by the British progressive rock band Family, released in March 1969.  The cover of the album was a takeoff from the sleeve of the Doors' second album, Strange Days, as Family admitted.

Background
The album was released on Reprise Records (RSLP6340) in stereo pressings, no mono pressings are known, in the USA, England and Germany. Initial UK pressings came with a black and white poster/lyric sheet inside. Original inner bags were the gold-on-white 'Egyptian' poly-lined Reprise house bags. The band were on tour in America and their manager hastily mixed and released the album without their approval. This proved to be the end of their relationship with manager John Gilbert (who retained the rights to the album via his Dukeslodge production deal which, by now, was registered in the Bahamas, the address of which was proudly printed on the album sleeve).

String arrangements were by Tony Cox, played by the Heavenly Strings, Nicky Hopkins played piano on some tracks. Alan Aldridge was the album designer with photos taken by Rodger Phillips.

Family Entertainment was the last album from the group's original lineup.

Family's momentum was almost derailed by the departure of bassist Ric Grech for Blind Faith two months after Family Entertainment's UK release, which caused their first US tour to founder, and Jim King only worsened the situation with his departure later in 1969.

Track listing
All selections are by Roger Chapman and John "Charlie" Whitney except where noted.

Personnel

Family
Roger Chapman – lead (1, 3, 5, 7-9, 11) and backing vocals, percussion
John "Charlie" Whitney – guitars, organ, piano
Jim King – saxophone, backing and lead (2) vocals, piano
Ric Grech – bass, backing and lead (6, 10) vocals, violin
Rob Townsend – drums, percussion
 sitar on track 10 probably played by Dave Mason

Additional personnel
Nicky Hopkins – piano

Technical
 Glyn Johns – producer, engineer
 John Gilbert – producer

References

External links
 

1969 albums
Family (band) albums
Albums produced by Glyn Johns
Reprise Records albums